The 1985 Ohio State Buckeyes football team represented the Ohio State University in the 1985 Big Ten Conference football season. The Buckeyes compiled a 9–3 record, including the 1985 Florida Citrus Bowl in Orlando, Florida, where they won, 10–7, against the BYU Cougars. One major highlight of the season for the Buckeyes was when they beat #1 Iowa 22-13 at home on November 2.

Schedule

Personnel

Season summary

Pittsburgh

Colorado

Washington State

Illinois

Indiana

Purdue

at Minnesota

Iowa

Source:

Northwestern

Wisconsin

at Michigan

Citrus Bowl (vs BYU)

Depth chart

Q

Awards and honors
Pepper Johnson, UPI First Team All-America
Pepper Johnson, Football News First Team All-America

1986 NFL draftees

References

Ohio State
Ohio State Buckeyes football seasons
Citrus Bowl champion seasons
Ohio State Buckeyes football